Ivett Szöllősi (born 22 December 1982) is a Hungarian biathlete. She competed in the women's individual event at the 2002 Winter Olympics.

References

1982 births
Living people
Biathletes at the 2002 Winter Olympics
Hungarian female biathletes
Olympic biathletes of Hungary
Sportspeople from Miskolc